A prankster is a person who enjoys playing pranks.

Prankster may also refer to:

 Prankster (Charlton Comics), a short-lived comic book super hero
 Prankster (comics), a DC Comics supervillain
 The Prankster (film), a 2010 teen comedy

See also
Trickster (disambiguation)